St. Mary's Alpine Provincial Park is a provincial park in British Columbia, Canada.  According to the Canadian Ministry of the Environment:
St. Mary’s Alpine Park is a wilderness paradise for the experienced backcountry traveller. Numerous lakes and tarns are tucked against rugged granite cliffs and surrounded by tundra and lingering snowfields. Seven creeks drain the lakes, resulting in numerous waterfalls and cataracts, some as much as 150 metres in height. Experienced hikers, willing to expend considerable effort in bushwhacking and route finding should visit this protected area where few, if any, people will be encountered.

References

External links

Provincial parks of British Columbia
Parks in the Regional District of East Kootenay
Protected areas established in 1973
1973 establishments in British Columbia